Kora Badan is a 1974 Bollywood drama film directed by Boota Singh Shaad.

Cast
Sunil Dutt   
Dev Kumar   
Paintal   
Mala Sinha
Gurcharan Pohli

Soundtrack
All songs were composed by Vedpal Sharma.

"Jhurmut Bole" - Krishna Bose, Manhar Udhas
"Paas Aake Baat Meri Sun" - Asha Bhosle
"Zindagi Zindadili Ka Naam Hai" - Asha Bhosle
"Main Dudh Ban Jaaungi" - 	Asha Bhosle 
"Meri Jawani Mujhko Sataye" - Hemlata
"Ek Bechara Bachpan Tha" - Krishna Bose

External links
 

1974 films
1970s Hindi-language films
1974 drama films